Fourth Ward School may refer to:
 Fourth Ward School (Virginia City, Nevada), an NRHP contributing property in the Virginia City Historic District 
 Fourth Ward School (Seneca Falls, New York), on the National Register of Historic Places listings in Seneca County, New York
 Fourth Ward School (San Antonio, Texas), on the National Register of Historic Places listings in Bexar County, Texas
 Fourth Ward School (Morgantown, West Virginia) on the National Register of Historic Places listings in Monongalia County, West Virginia

See also
Ward School (disambiguation)